Milad may refer to:

 Milad (given name)
 Milad Dezful F.C., Iranian football club based in Dezful, Iran
 Milad Hospital, hospital in Iran
 Milad Rizk (fl. 2010–2015), a Lebanese actor
 Milad Tower, tallest tower in Iran
 Mawlid, the observance of the birthday of the Islamic prophet Muhammad

See also
Eid-e-Milad, the observance of the birthday of Islamic prophet Muhammad